Shahla ( []; ; ; ; ; ;) is a feminine given name used throughout the Muslim world.

It is based on the feminine form of the Arabic adjective  in the sense "whose eyes have ", which is said to have meant "a blue or greenish hue" in Classical Arabic, or "black with some blueness in them" (navy blue color). Some sources also say "black with redness" (i.e. very dark maroon). Others say the name means "dark-grey-eyed", "hazel-eyed", or simply "who has beautiful eyes".

Alternate spellings: Chahla, Chahlaa, Chehla, Chehlaa, Shehla, Shehlaa, Shahlaa.

People

Shahla
 Shahla Aghapour, Iranian artist, author and gallery director
 Shahla Arbabi (born 1945), Iranian-born American artist
 Shahla Ata (1959–2015), Afghan politician
 Shahla Habibi (1958–2017), Iranian advisor
 Shahla Humbatova, Azerbaijani human rights lawyer
 Shahla Jahed (1970–2010), Iranian nurse
 Shahla Khatun, Bangladeshi physician and professor
 Shahla Lahiji (born 1942), Iranian writer, publisher, translator, and publishing house director
 Shahla Riahi (1927–2019), Iranian actress and film director
 Shahla Sherkat (born 1956), Iranian journalist, author, and activist
 Shahla Ujayli (born 1976), Syrian writer
 Shahla Safi Zamir (born 1948), Iranian singer
 Shahla Zia (1947–2005), Pakistani lawyer and activist

Chahla
 Chahla Benmokhtar (born 1997), Algerian volleyball player
 Chahla Chafiq (born 1954), Iranian writer and sociologist

Shahlo
 Shahlo Mahmudova, Uzbekistani politician

Shehla
 Shehla Masood (1973–2011), Indian environmentalist, wildlife and Right to Information activist
 Shehla Pervin, Indian-American breast cancer specialist
 Shehla Rashid (born 1988), Indian human rights activist
 Shehla Raza (born 1964), Pakistani politician

References

See also
 Shahla (disambiguation)

Arabic feminine given names
Indian feminine given names
Iranian feminine given names
Pakistani feminine given names